Phantasm: Ravager (sometimes stylised as Phantasm: RaVager, and also known as Phantasm V: Ravager) is a 2016 American science fantasy action horror film, and the fifth and final installment in the Phantasm series. It marks the only film in the series not directed by Don Coscarelli, although he acts as producer and co-writer. It is directed by David Hartman and stars A. Michael Baldwin, Reggie Bannister, and Angus Scrimm in his final appearance as the Tall Man.

Plot
The film begins with Reggie, wandering in the desert on foot, having returned from wherever he journeyed at the end of the previous film. Reggie is given a ride by a passing motorist who happens to be driving Reggie's Barracuda. He throws the thief out but two spheres suddenly fly by. One sphere kills the thief while the other pursues Reggie. While fending off the spheres, Reggie suddenly awakens in a hospital, much older, in a wheelchair, and suffering from dementia. Mike is with him and they discuss matters of reality relating to Reggie's condition. In an apparent dream world, Reggie meets a woman who mistakes him for a friend. Her car isn't working, so he offers her a lift. They go to a cabin on a farm and Reggie learns that a Bulgarian man, Demeter, also works there. Reggie tells her about his dealings with The Tall Man over the years and she is amazed by his tale. He tries his usual lady wooing but is politely rebuffed. Later, The Tall Man shows up accompanied by his spheres. Reggie dreams of being in a hospital again but it appears to be from the 1860's. Jebediah Morningside, the undertaker/scientist whom The Tall Man possessed, is lying in the bed next to him. Jebediah explains he's near death and has lost many friends. However his demeanor suddenly shifts to The Tall Man and Reggie sees the Lady in Lavender is physically conjoined with him and they warn him that he cannot escape.

The next morning Reggie looks for the lady he picked up, Dawn, but finds that she's been killed by spheres. Reggie equips himself with a shotgun. The spheres force him into a nearby barn. A man wielding an axe confronts him and it is revealed he is Demeter. One sphere kills a horse while another manages to get inside the barn, killing Demeter, before Reggie fights it off. Reggie speaks to Mike again in the hospital. Mike tells him about a new threat looming. Back in his dream, Reggie goes through the woods. Along a path, he encounters a gigantic sphere hovering in the sky and Reggie is back at the hospital again. Reggie alternates between the other world in both his dream and the present time. The Tall Man appears and pontificates how their paths have crossed over time. In 1978 (erroneously stated 1979), Reggie attended a funeral at Morningside Mortuary and from that day onward his life became a nightmare. The Tall Man offers to return Reggie's family if he ceases to meddle in his affairs.

Reggie is next seen in a mortuary, first contending with dwarfs and then The Lady in Lavender appears. She is shot by Reggie and seemingly killed. Continuing on, Reggie goes into a large cave, shooting a dwarf and the place shakes. The Tall Man asks him if he's considered his offer, but when Reggie retaliates, The Tall Man again reminds him his chances are depleting. Reggie wants his friends Jody and Mike back, but The Tall Man recognizes his "loyalty" for his friends as foolishness. In yet another dream sequence which he alternates with the nightmare world, Reggie is strapped to a gurney as armed masked people appear. One is named Chunk and the other is revealed to be the person Reggie knew as Dawn despite her death, but she says her name is actually Jane and she thinks Reggie is delusional. She radios in some people. Reggie fails to convince her they know each other, but she gets him medical attention instead. More dwarfs and gravers arrive and attack but Chunk saves him and gives him a weapon. Dawn and Chunk take Reggie to other members of their group who are fighting The Tall Man. Mike is reunited with Reggie and they escape the hospital. Mike tells Reggie he's been "on ice" for a decade, making it 1998, and that the Earth belongs to The Tall Man now.

In the dream world, Reggie wanders around the hospital hallways, but a nurse orders him back to his room. In the nightmare world, an enemy has grabbed him. A spiked sphere then kills one of the people helping Reggie. Mike visits Reggie at the hospital, and says his dream orientates him. Mike reveals he had a dream too where he was in the desert, looking for Reggie. It turns out Mike still has his connection to The Tall Man even after his cranial sphere was removed. Mike explains how The Tall Man unleashed a plague that caused a worldwide apocalypse on society. Jane is caught by The Tall Man, so Chunk, Mike, and Reggie travel through a dimension fork into his world. On the Red Planet, they confront The Tall Man and his minions but Jane is killed. Chunk, posing as a dwarf next to The Tall Man, blows himself up to destroy him. Back at the hospital, Reggie fights gravers alongside Mike. Jody shows up in the Barracuda, fitted with onboard machine guns, to pick them up. After driving awhile, they decide to head north as The Tall Man is repelled by cold. In the dream world, Reggie seemingly passes away with Mike and Jody at his bedside and the film ends.

During a mid-credits scene, Chunk appears through a dimension fork along a desert road, missing a hand, and meets up with Rocky. Chunk flirts with her, asking if he "has a chance." Rocky teases back saying "there are no other guys around" but then the gang pulls up in the Barracuda and they join them. Many giant spheres are seen in the sky looming over ruined cities, indicating the war with The Tall Man still wages on.

Cast
 Angus Scrimm as The Tall Man
 A. Michael Baldwin as Mike Pearson
 Reggie Bannister as Reggie
 Dawn Cody as Dawn/Jane
 Stephen Jutras as Chunk
 Bill Thornbury as Jody Pearson
 Kathy Lester as The Lady in Lavender
 Gloria Lynne Henry as Rocky
 Daniel Roebuck as Demeter
 Solly Duran as Raina
 Daniel Schweiger as Thief

Production
In 2004, six years after the release of Phantasm IV: Oblivion, series director Don Coscarelli told Fangoria, "I'd also still like to do another Phantasm film. Reggie Bannister and Angus Scrimm are still in great shape and raring to go."

In March 2005, Coscarelli was in the final stages of talks with New Line Cinema to produce a new entry. Reportedly, the new film was "being developed as a relaunch and as a possible trilogy about Mike's coming of age." This version never came to fruition.

Rumors about a sequel were reignited in June 2007 by footage contained in Don Coscarelli's Farewell to the Alamo Drafthouse, featuring Angus Scrimm and A. Michael Baldwin in their roles. In an interview, Reggie Bannister stated there was no activity or development of a fifth film but that anything was possible in the future.

In June 2012, rumors again surfaced that Coscarelli would begin a new Phantasm sequel. According to a report on Dread Central, the script was completed and filming would begin later in the year.  Coscarelli disputed this claim, publicly stating, "I have no solid news to report on a new project now." The director, however, was being coy with film news sites.  According to what Coscarelli and new co-writer-director David Hartman told Entertainment Weekly, the film was shot secretly in and around southern California during 2012 and 2013.

On March 26, 2014, news of Ravagers completion was released via various film news sites.  The next day, a trailer debuted on the film's official site. In a 2014 "sneak peek" video preview on the official Phantasm website, director Hartman mentioned in quick passing, "This thing is going to be in the can 2015... for sure." By October 2015, Ravager was completed and awaited a distributor.

Production on the film was briefly halted when Coscarelli supervised a 4K restoration of the original Phantasm.  On January 9, 2016, actor Angus Scrimm, who played The Tall Man, died at age 89.

Release
Phantasm V: Ravager  premiered in Austin's Fantastic Fest on September 25, 2016. It was released in the United States in theaters and via digital HD on October 7, 2016. The film and its predecessors were digitally remastered for home media soon thereafter.

Reception
Rotten Tomatoes, a review aggregator, reports that 57% of 14 surveyed critics gave the film a positive review; the average rating is 5.1/10.  Metacritic, another review aggregator, rated it 51/100 based on seven reviews.  Joe Leydon of Variety and Marten Carlson of Consequence of Sound both criticized the film's narrative cohesiveness.  Leydon speculated that the film's troubled production may have caused this, and Carlson more directly blamed the film's origin as a series of shorts.  Both said this will probably cause outsiders to be confused by the film.  In comparing it to the previous films, Carlson said it "captures the heart, if not the quality", though fans will likely forgive its faults, as they did the first film.  Leydon, though describing it as "a patchwork quilt of outtakes from its four predecessors", also cited the appeal to fans to revisit their favorite characters.  Though recognizing the film's narrative weakness, Michele Galgana of Screen Anarchy wrote, "Still, it's impossible to overlook the fun that you see all these guys having, and their hearts are all in the right place."

Simon Abrams of Roger Ebert.com gave the film two and a half stars saying the "CGI-intensive action scenes are distractingly ugly-looking. The camerawork is also amateurish, and the film's drab, undistinguished dialogue is only interesting when it's explicitly calling back to the original Phantasm." Marten Carlson of Consequence of Sound criticized the look of the film saying "at its best, though, the film’s cheap production is impossible to ignore. The cinematography is flat and appears to have been shot on a consumer HD camera. The special effects are achieved primarily with low-grade CGI that’s laughable at times." Carlson ultimately said "All formal complaints aside, Ravager is successful in its attempt to capture the spirit of the series. Phantasm has always been about family, the love between brothers and friends, and seeing Reggie and Mike together again, we can only feel the sincerity of their relationship." Reviewers at Bloody Disgusting were split with Trace Thurman placing it on his "5 Worst Horror Movies of 2016" yet John Squires loved it. However, both agreed the film looked like a "cheaply-made student film."

References

External links

 
 
 Phantasm Ravager at Rotten Tomatoes

2016 films
2016 horror films
2010s science fiction films
American science fiction horror films
American independent films
American supernatural horror films
American sequel films
American action horror films
Phantasm (franchise)
2010s English-language films
2010s American films